The Great Mosque of Adana, also known as the Ramazanoglu Mosque ),  is a 16th-century mosque in Adana, Turkey. It forms part of a complex (külliye) that includes a madrasah and a mausoleum (türbe). The buildings are on Kızılay street, next to the Ramazanoğlu Hall.

History
The construction of the mosque was begun in 1513 by Ramazanoğlu Halil Bey and completed by his son and successor, Piri Mehmet Paşa, in 1541. For 450 years, until the building of the Sabancı Merkez Camii, the mosque was the largest in Adana. It was damaged in the 1998 Adana–Ceyhan earthquake and the restoration by the General Directorate of the Foundations (Vakıflar Genel Müdürlüğü) was completed in 2004.

The mosque
The building carries features of Mamluk, Seljuk and the Ottoman architectural design.  The western entrance is older than the main building and differs in style from the part built by Ramazanoğlu Halil Bey. The conical stalactite roof that rises step by step above the entrance has the features of Seljukid architecture. This gives an indication that Ramadanids, who were a small beylik (emirate) in the early 16th century, initially built a small mosque, and later built the main building beside it when the beylik expanded and the small mosque was no longer sufficient.

The courtyard is entered through large gates on the west and the east sides. The northern section of the courtyard is covered with a wooden roof supported on pillars and thus can serve as an extension to the prayer hall and as an outdoor area for praying in summer. At the east end of the courtyard the entrance at the side of the main hall, is decorated with black and white marble panels. The semi-pointed arches are decorated with stalactite and flower motifs.

The main prayer hall occupies the width of the rectangular plan and consists of two aisles of five bays separated by columns supporting semi-pointed arches. The mihrab is decorated with Iznik tiles and framed by black marble panels. Iznik tiles, which also decorate the qibla wall, were added after 1552.

The minaret, near the eastern entrance to the courtyard, has a covered balcony and shows a Mamluk influence.  The exterior of the minaret is decorated with stone of two different colors.

Madrasah
The madrasah of mosque is on the east side of the mosque and is described in early documents as the 'Old Madrasah'.

The madrasah, with the simple and clear stonework, and the fountain with eight columns supporting a pyramidal roof, has a spacious look. Because of a small masjid squeezed on its northwest corner and an unrelated building placed beside, it does not provide a well-planned and a monumental view.

There are dervish cells on the east, west and south side of the nearly square courtyard, whose sides measure . On the north side of the courtyard there is the main classroom covered with back to back two domes.

The west gate, built higher than the cells, has a simple architecture and leads to the courtyard through a short hallway with a cradle vault. The two cells on the south side of the entrance are thought to be the kitchen of the madrasah, now used as toilet. In contrast, the qibla cells are smaller than the cells on the west side and have a square plan.

At the east wing, except the ones at the corner, the cells have the same width with the cells on the south wing. Like the others, the cells are covered with cradle vaults from inside and with grooved bricks outside. There are two extra niche on the corner cell and one extra on the third and fifth cells from south. At the cells on the qibla wing, there are two windows that face the courtyard and the street.

The most interesting part of the madrasah is the classroom which is made up of two lined up domes with sharp arches and pendentive. Although the classrooms at the Turkish madrasah of Seljuk era and after were built with vault or as a single hall with a dome, the reason that it was built in rectangle shape with two lined up domes at this madrasah can be explained in terms of reducing the effects of the hot weather. The rims of the domes are not high. White and red stones were used in sequence on the front sharp arch of the hall.

The rear walls of the east wing, the chimney and the north part of the classroom are made of brick, the rest of the madrasah is made of white stone. Although the inner walls of the cells are coated with plaster, the outer surfaces are not.

The design of the classroom as a back to back two domed space and the U-shape line up of the dervish cells around the courtyard distinguishes the mosque's madrasa from Seljukid and Ottoman madrasas. Being the oldest among the Ramazanoğlu madrasah, another distinctive feature, similar to Yağ Camii madrasah, is the stone walls of the classroom front and the brick walls of the rear. The geometric decorations on the west window of the classroom is exactly the same as the geometric decorations of the arches at the entrance of the mosque.

Ornamentation
The portal niche of the madrasah is decorated with a beveled molding which make a knot on a pillar and keystone on both sides. The surrounding of the inscription is decorated with palmets (fan-shaped glyph) and small badges. The second of the two rectangular windows on the east and the west walls of the hall is framed with geometrically patterned molding that forms with the intersection of thread line with checker and six-armed stars that have a flower with six leaves at the center. Ornaments of the window on the east wall are not completed.

Inscription and chronogram
The only inscription on the madrasah is the two lines of thuluth script on the crown gate. The text reads:

"This holy madrasah was built by the son of Halil Bey, Piri, in need of Allah's mercy, on the year nine forty seven, in the middle of the month of Muharram, during the reign of the greatest and the most eminent Shah Sultan Süleyman – Allah last his estate – for the sake of Allah."

The chronogram indicates that the madrasah was completed in May, 1540. Although the builder of the madrasah is known as Ramazanoğlu Piri Pasha, the architect is unknown.

Mausoleum of the Ramadanids
The mausoleum (türbe) of the Ramadanids, with its tall rims and tall dome giving grandeur to it, houses sarcophagi of Halil Bey and the sons of Piri Paşa, Mehmet Bey and Mustafa Bey. The walls of the mausoleum are covered with tiles.

The mosque's mausoleum, unlike most Seljuk mausoleums, is built east of the mosque and although situated next to the mosque, is not integrated with it. The mausoleum has a dome covered upper section containing sarcophagi and an entrance section covered with a cross vault. The entrance section is connected to the mosque by an intermediate door and to the mausoleum by another door.

There is a window on the east wall. Further north, the shed, that is built on  headed four columns, is covered with a wooden roof resulting from the cradle vault perpendicularly cutting the half-transverse vault.

The sharp dome of the mausoleum with a polygon rim and the triangle inference is similar to the dome at the mosque's mihrab front. Window with a coloured glass is placed on each of its 12 edges and unlike the mihrab's front dome, black stone is not used.

The walls of the mausoleum are as thick as the walls of the mosque; the difference from the mosque's qibla walls is the yellowish stones. It is also distinctive due to being built completely of fine shaped stones, unlike the mosque walls, which are built with rough stones in the middle and fine shaped stones surrounding.

The sarcophagi are covered with 16th century tiles. On the front side of the sarcophagi there are inscriptions on the tiles. The inscriptions being written in the same type shows that they are all written after March 1552.

Other than the mosque's mausoleum and the Yeşil Türbe in Bursa, there are no other examples of mausoleums covered with tiles. The design of the mosque is similar to those built in Central Asia.

Mausoleum outside the mosque complex 
There is also a mausoleum south of the mosque that stands as an independent structure. It is hexagonal in plan and is covered with a high dome. Since there are no inscriptions on the sarcophagi, the occupants and the date of construction are not known. The mausoleum is built in the baroque style indicating that it dates from towards the end of the 18th century.

Gallery

See also 
 Islamic architecture
 List of mosques
 Ottoman architecture
 List of Turkish Grand Mosques

References

Sources

Further reading

External links

Ramazanoglu Camii, Archnet.
Photographs by Dick Osseman
360 degree panoramas of the mosque

Mosques in Adana
Landmarks in Adana
Religious buildings and structures completed in 1541
Mosque buildings with domes
Adana
16th-century mosques